The 1975 are  an English pop rock band originating from Manchester.

AIM Awards
The AIM Independent Music Awards are hosted by the Association of Independent Music (AIM) and were established in 2011 to recognize artists signed to independent record labels in the United Kingdom.

!
|-
| 2013
| The 1975
| Independent Breakthrough of the Year
|
| style="text-align:center;"|
|}

BBC

BBC Music Awards
The BBC Music Awards are the BBC's annual pop music awards, held every December, as a celebration of the musical achievements over the past twelve months.

!
|-
| 2016
| "What Makes You Beautiful' (One Direction cover)
| Radio 1 Live Lounge Performance of the Year
|
| style="text-align:center;"|
|}

BBC Radio 1's Hottest Record of the Year

!
|-
| rowspan="1" | 2018
| rowspan="1" | "Give Yourself a Try"
| rowspan="1" | Hottest Record of the Year
|
| style="text-align:center;"|
|}

BBC Radio 1's Teen Awards
The BBC Teen Awards is a music event exclusively for youngsters aged 14–17.

!
|-
| 2014
| The 1975
|  Best British Group
| 
| style="text-align:center;"|
|}

Brit Awards
The Brit Awards are the British Phonographic Industry's annual pop music awards.

!
|-
|rowspan="2"|2017
|The 1975
|British Group
|
|rowspan="2" style="text-align:center;"|
|-
|I Like It When You Sleep, for You Are So Beautiful yet So Unaware of It
|British Album of the Year
|
|-
|rowspan="2"|2019
|The 1975
|British Group
|
|rowspan="2" style="text-align:center;"|
|-
|A Brief Inquiry into Online Relationships
|rowspan=2|British Album of the Year
|
|-
|rowspan="3"|2023
|Being Funny in a Foreign Language
|
|rowspan="3" style="text-align:center;"|
|-
|rowspan=2|The 1975
|British Group
|
|-
|British Rock/Alternative Act
|
|}

GAFFA Awards

GAFFA Awards (Denmark)
Delivered since 1991, the GAFFA Awards are a Danish award that rewards popular music by the magazine of the same name.

!
|-
| rowspan=2|2019
| The 1975
| Best International Band
| 
|-
| A Brief Inquiry into Online Relationships
| Best International Album
|

GAFFA Awards (Sweden)
Delivered since 2010, the GAFFA Awards (Swedish: GAFFA Priset) are a Swedish award that rewards popular music awarded by the magazine of the same name.

!
|-
| 2019
| The 1975
| Best Foreign Band
| 
| style="text-align:center;" |
|-
|}

Grammy Awards
The Grammy Awards are awarded annually by The Recording Academy of the United States for outstanding achievements in the music industry.

!
|-
| 2017
| | I Like It When You Sleep, for You Are So Beautiful yet So Unaware of It
|Grammy Award for Best Boxed or Special Limited Edition Package
|
| style="text-align:center;"|
|-
| 2020
| | "Give Yourself A Try"
|Grammy Award for Best Rock Song
|
| style="text-align:center;"|
|}
Note: Only Samuel Burgess-Johnson & Matthew Healy were the art directors for the album cover and received the 2017 nomination. Jack Antonoff won a Grammy as Producer of the Year - including the song „Part of the Band“ by The 1975.

GQ Men of the Year Awards
The GQ Men of the Year Awards are awarded annually by GQ in celebration of the men and women who shape the world's cultural landscape.

!
|-
| 2019
| The 1975
| Beats by Dr Dre Band
| 
| style="text-align:center;"| 
|-
|}

Hungarian Music Awards
The Hungarian Music Awards have been given to artists in the field of Hungarian music since 1992. The award categories are similar to the Grammy Awards in the United States and the Brit Awards in the United Kingdom.

!
|-
| rowspan="1" | 2017
| rowspan="3" | I Like It When You Sleep, for You Are So Beautiful yet So Unaware of It
| rowspan="3" | Alternative or indie rock album of the year or voice recording
|
| style="text-align:center;"|
|}

Ivor Novello Awards
The Ivor Novello Awards are awards for songwriting and composing; presented annually in London by the British Academy of Songwriters, Composers, and Authors (BASCA).

!
|-
| rowspan="2"|2019
| "Love It If We Made It"
| Best Contemporary Song
| rowspan="2" 
| rowspan="2" style="text-align:center;"|
|-
| The 1975
| Songwriters of the Year
|-
|}

Knight of Illumination Awards 
The Knight of Illumination Awards (KOI) began in 2007, celebrating video and light designers for their creative work in the UK. 
!
|-
!scope="row"| 2016
| The 1975 
| The Ayrton Award for Stage
| 
| style="text-align:center;"|
|}

The award was won by designer Tobias G. Rylander, who has worked alongside frontman Matty Healy on the band's stage set up.

Mercury Prize
The Mercury Prize, formerly the Mercury Music Prize, is an annual music prize awarded for the best album from the United Kingdom or Ireland.

!
|-
|2016
| I Like It When You Sleep, for You Are So Beautiful yet So Unaware of It
| rowspan="2"| Album of the Year
| rowspan="2"  
| style="text-align:center;"|
|-
| 2019
| A Brief Inquiry into Online Relationships
| style="text-align:center;"|
|-
|}

MTV Awards

MTV Europe Music Awards
The MTV Europe Music Awards (commonly abbreviated as the EMAs) was established in 1994 by MTV Europe to award the music videos from European and international artists.

!
|-
| rowspan="1" | 2016
| rowspan="2"| The 1975
| rowspan="2" | Best Alternative
|
| style="text-align:center;"|
|-
| rowspan="1"|2018 
|  
| rowspan="4" style="text-align:center;"|
|-
|}

MTV Video Music Awards
The MTV Video Music Awards (commonly abbreviated as the VMAs) was established in 1984 by MTV to award the music videos from the year.

!
|-
| 2019
| "Love It If We Made It"
| Best Rock
| 
|
|-
| rowspan="2"|2020
| "If You're Too Shy (Let Me Know)"
| Best Alternative
| 
|
|-
| The 1975
| Best Group
| 
|
|-
|}

mtvU Woodie Awards
mtvU, a division of MTV Networks owned by Viacom, broadcasts a 24-hour television channel available on more than 750 college and university campuses across the United States.

!
|-
!scope="row"| 2014
| The 1975 
| the breaking woodie
| 
| style="text-align:center;"|
|}

NME

NME Awards
The NME Awards were created by the NME magazine and was first held in 1953.

!
|-
| 2014
| rowspan="6"|The 1975
| rowspan="2"|Worst Band
| 
| style="text-align:center;"|
|-
| 2015
| 
| style="text-align:center;"|
|-
| rowspan="2"|2016
| Best Fan Community 
| 
| rowspan="2" style="text-align:center;"|
|-
| rowspan="2"|Best British Band
| 
|-
| rowspan="4"|2017
| 
| rowspan="4" style="text-align:center;"|
|-
| Best Live Band
| 
|-
| | I Like It When You Sleep, for You Are So Beautiful yet So Unaware of It
| Best Album
| 
|-
| "Somebody Else"
| Best Track 
| 
|-
| rowspan="2"|2018
| rowspan="2"|The 1975 
|Best British Band
| 
| rowspan="2" style="text-align:center;"|
|-
| Best Festival Headliner 
| 
|}

Pollstar Awards
Pollstar is a trade publication for the concert tour industry. It gets its information primarily from the agents, managers and promoters who produce concerts. Pollstar holds an annual award ceremony to honor artists and professionals in the concert industry.

!
|-
| rowspan="1" | 2017
| rowspan="3" | The 1975
| rowspan="3" | Best New Touring Artist
|
| style="text-align:center;"|
|}

Q Awards
The Q Awards are the United Kingdom's annual music awards run by the music magazine Q to honour musical excellence. Winners are voted by readers of Q online, with others decided by a judging panel.

!
|-
|-
|2014
| rowspan="2"|The 1975
| Best New Act
| 
| style="text-align:center;"|
|-
| rowspan="4"|2016
| Best Act in the World Today
| 
| rowspan="4" style="text-align:center;"|
|-
| | I Like It When You Sleep, for You Are So Beautiful yet So Unaware of It
| Best Album
| 
|-
| "Somebody Else"
| Best Track 
| 
|-
| "A Change of Heart"
| Best Video
| 
|-
| 2017
| rowspan="2"|The 1975
| rowspan="2"|Best Act in the World Today
| 
| style="text-align:center;"|
|-
| rowspan="2"|2018
| 
|rowspan="2" style="text-align:center;"|
|-
| "Love It If We Made It"
| rowspan=2|Best Track
| 
|-
| rowspan=4|2019
| "People"
| 
| rowspan=4 style="text-align:center;"|
|-
| A Brief Inquiry into Online Relationships
| Best Album
| 
|-
| The 1975 - Reading Festival
| Best Live Performance
| 
|-
| The 1975
| Best Act in the World Today
| 
|}

Teen Choice Awards
The Teen Choice Awards is an annual awards show that airs on the Fox Network. The awards honour the year's biggest achievements in music, films, sports, television, fashion and other categories, voted by teenage viewers.

!
|-  
|2016
| The 1975
| Choice Summer Music Star: Group
| 
| style="text-align:center;"|
|-
|}

UK Music Video Awards
The UK Music Video Awards is an annual award ceremony founded in 2008 to recognise creativity, technical excellence and innovation in music videos and moving images for music.

!
|-
| 2016
| "A Change of Heart"
| rowspan=2|Best Pop Video - UK
| 
| style="text-align:center;"|
|-
| rowspan=2|2019
| "Sincerity Is Scary"
| 
|style="text-align:center;" rowspan=2|
|-
| "Love It If We Made It"
| Best Rock Video - UK
| 
|-
| 2022
| "Part of the Band"
| Best Pop Video - UK
| 
| 
|-
|}

UK Festival Awards
The UK Festival Awards are awarded annually, with various categories for all aspects of festivals that have taken place in the UK, and one category for European festivals.

!
|-
| rowspan="1"| 2013
| rowspan="2"| The 1975
| rowspan="2"| Best Breakthrough Act
| 
| style="text-align:center;"|
|-
| rowspan="2"| 2014
| 
| rowspan="2" style="text-align:center;"|
|-
| rowspan="1"|"Chocolate"
| rowspan="1"| Anthem Of The Summer
| 
|-
|}

Žebřík Music Awards

!Ref.
|-
| 2013
| The 1975
| Best International Discovery
| 
|

References

Awards
Lists of awards received by British musician
Lists of awards received by musical group